Apple flour is flour made from the milling of apple pomace, a mix of about 54% pulp, 34% peels, 7% seeds, 4% seed cores, and 2% stems remaining after apples have been squeezed and crushed for their juice.  It is also called "apple pomace flour," which may contain higher amounts of dietary fiber than refined white flour.

References 

Flour
Flour